The Italian ambassador in Lisbon is the official representative of the Government in Rome to the Government of Portugal. 

Since 1860 the governments in Rome and Lisbon maintain diplomatic relations.

List of representatives 
<onlyinclude>

References 

 
Portugal
Italy